Same-sex marriage in Washington may refer to:
 Same-sex marriage in Washington (state)
 Same-sex marriage in Washington, D.C.